The Brain of  Morbius is the fifth serial of the 13th season of the British science fiction television series Doctor Who, which was first broadcast in four weekly parts on BBC1 from 3 to 24 January 1976. The screenwriter credit is given to Robin Bland, a pseudonym for writer and former script editor Terrance Dicks, whose original script had been heavily rewritten by his successor as script editor, Robert Holmes. It is the first serial to feature the Sisterhood of Karn.

The serial is considered to have many thematic links to Mary Shelley's novel Frankenstein.
It is set on the planet Karn, where the surgeon Mehendri Solon (Philip Madoc) seeks to create a body for the Time Lord war criminal Morbius (Stuart Fell and Michael Spice) from parts of other creatures that have come to the planet.

Plot summary

On the planet Karn, an insect-like alien is killed by Condo who takes its head to a castle and his master Solon. However, the head is unsuitable — Solon needs a head from a warm-blooded humanoid.

The TARDIS materialises and the Fourth Doctor rushes out, the Time Lords having diverted him to this planet. Sarah Jane Smith finds a valley filled with wrecked spacecraft, as well as the headless body of the alien which is identified as a Mutt. She and the Doctor make for the castle that she spots. The travellers are welcomed by Solon who compliments the Doctor on his "magnificent" head.

Meanwhile, the Sisterhood of Karn discover the TARDIS and teleport it to their temple. Their elderly leader, Maren, identifies it as a Time Lord vessel, and believes that the Doctor has come to steal their Elixir of Life.

The Doctor knows of Solon as an authority on microsurgical techniques and tissue transplant. The Doctor recognises a clay bust as that of Morbius, one of the Time Lords' greatest criminals.  Before he can say anything further, a drug takes effect, and the Doctor passes out. Sarah Jane pretends that she has succumbed. In the laboratory, Solon's examination of the Doctor confirms that he is a Time Lord. As he and Condo leave the room, the Doctor vanishes. Sarah Jane keeps hidden and enters the lab. She draws back the curtain on a bed, thinking it is the Doctor, but as the lights come up, she sees a headless, patchwork creature made from various body parts.

The Doctor regains consciousness to find himself surrounded by members of the Sisterhood. The Doctor realises that just before he passed out, he felt the mind of Morbius. Maren refuses to believe him.

Sarah Jane follows Solon and Condo as they make their way towards the temple. Solon asks the Sisters to spare the Doctor, or at least give him the Doctor's head. A disguised Sarah frees the Doctor, but she is blinded by the energy from Maren's ring. They return to the castle, where the Doctor asks Solon to examine Sarah Jane's eyes. Solon tells him that Sarah's retinas have been almost completely destroyed, but there is one chance: the Elixir of Life. The Doctor goes to the Sisterhood, unaware that Solon has lied about Sarah Jane's condition and has notified the Sisterhood that the Doctor is coming back.

Sarah Jane hears a voice calling for Solon. Following the sound, she enters a hidden laboratory and stumbles blindly towards a glowing brain in a tank, which accuses her of being sent by the Sisterhood to destroy it. Solon enters and drags her away. As he closes the door, she hears Solon address the voice as "Morbius" and hears how Solon has sent the Doctor into a trap. She locks Solon in the laboratory and, still blind, makes her way out of the castle.

The Doctor is captured by the Sisterhood. When he explains why he came back, Maren tells him that the ray's effect is not permanent, and Solon knows that. The Doctor believes that something evil related to Morbius is happening. Maren affirms that she saw Morbius dispersed. The Doctor asks if Solon was present. Morbius had led an army of mercenaries, promising them the Elixir and immortality and revealing its existence to the cosmos. The Doctor reignites the flame with a "Little Demon."

Sarah Jane is captured and taken back to the castle. Learning that the Doctor is a Time Lord, Morbius fears the Time Lords have tracked him down and will return in force. Morbius insists that he be transferred into the patchwork body now, with an artificial brain casing that Solon constructed. Solon protests, as there may be severe pain and seizures, but Morbius insists. Back in the castle, Solon prepares to operate, but Condo is enraged when he recognises his lost arm attached to the patchwork body. He attacks Solon before being shot in the stomach, their struggle knocking Morbius' brain to the floor. Not knowing what damage has been done, Solon places the fallen brain in the casing, releasing Sarah Jane so she can assist in the operation. He threatens her into doing so, saying that if Morbius dies, then so does she.

The wounded Condo crawls into the hallway as outside, the Sisters carry the Doctor through the lightning storm. In the meantime, the operation is finished — within minutes Morbius will live again. Solon goes to answer the doorbell, and sees the Sisters leaving the Doctor's body in the parlour. In the laboratory, Sarah Jane's eyesight starts to clear, but the monstrous body of Morbius gets off the operating table and lumbers towards her.

Sarah Jane screams as she sees the Morbius creature, and dodges out of the way. She warns Solon that the creature is loose and he runs back to the lab. Sarah Jane notices the Doctor's body, but as she approaches, the Doctor wakes up and smiles at her. He is here to stop Solon, but Sarah Jane tells him it is too late. But Morbius is revealed to not be in his right mind as he knocks Solon out and then the Doctor. Morbius chases Sarah Jane, but Condo intervenes, knocking Sarah Jane down the stairs into the cellar while he grapples with Morbius. Morbius kills Condo then wanders out of the castle as the Doctor regains consciousness. He carries Sarah Jane into the secret lab to let her recover.

Solon has awakened and assembles a tranquilliser gun. He tells the Doctor that the operation was not complete, only the motor functions are working, the rest on an instinctual level. Knowing Morbius' hatred, he will seek out the Sisterhood. Morbius finds one of the Sisters in some ruins nearby and kills her. The Doctor and Solon find the body and they search the ruins. Morbius attacks the Doctor, but is knocked out by Solon's tranquilliser. As they carry the creature back to the castle, the Doctor tells Solon that Morbius's brain will be detached and returned to the Time Lords.

The body of the dead Sister is brought back to Maren. Ohica reports that witnesses saw a creature and then the Doctor and Solon hunting for it. Maren realises that Solon has succeeded in his experiments and resurrected their ancient enemy. But Maren is too old and weak to leave the shrine, and she gives Ohica permission to lead the Sisters to the castle.

The Doctor gives Solon five minutes to disconnect the brain as he goes and checks on Sarah Jane. However, Solon locks them in the secret lab instead and begins to repair Morbius. Using materials from the secret lab, the Doctor makes cyanogen gas, which he then pipes through a vent that leads to the operating room above, reaching Solon and killing him, but Morbius survives, as his lungs filter out the poison.  Morbius confronts Sarah Jane and the Doctor, claiming that when the knowledge of his resurrection spreads, his followers will rise in their millions. The Doctor and Sarah Jane mock Morbius in an attempt to overheat his brain, and the Doctor challenges him to a mindbending contest.

They grab hold of the appropriate apparatus in the laboratory and begin. The machine's display shows Morbius' brain casing head, then his previous face, then the Doctor, then the Doctor's previous incarnation. After going through the Doctor's previous incarnations, eight other faces are shown before Morbius' brain case shorts out. The Doctor collapses, as Morbius stumbles out in a daze. The Sisterhood arrive and chase Morbius over a cliff, apparently to his death. Then Ohica finds Sarah Jane crying over the Doctor.

Taking the Doctor back to the shrine, Maren says only the Elixir of Life can save him, but there is none left. However, the revived Flame has gathered enough Elixir. There is enough for the Doctor, but not for Maren, who accepts that the Doctor was right: there should be an end. The Elixir is given to the Doctor, who revives almost immediately. Maren steps into the Flame of Life, becoming younger, and then vanishes.

Ohica starts to thank the Doctor, but he stops her, saying that he and Sarah Jane have another engagement. He gives her a pair of curious objects in case they need to relight the Flame again. When Ohica asks what they are, the Doctor answers, "A mighty atom and a thunderflash." He explains that the writing on the cardboard tubes reads: "Light the blue touch paper and stand clear." This time, the TARDIS vanishes in a puff of light and smoke.

Continuity
The 2020 series finale of series 12, The Timeless Children, revealed that The Doctor is in fact a transdimensional foundling originally known as the Timeless Child, possessing an infinite capacity to regenerate but now retaining only memories from the incarnation known as the "First Doctor" (Hartnell) forward. The Time Lords developed the ability to regenerate by studying the Timeless Child's natural ability. The episode included a sequence where scenes from throughout the programme's run are used to represent the Doctor's recollection of her past incarnations, with the incarnations from The Brain of Morbius specifically included.

Production
The original script was written by Terrance Dicks, using some ideas from his script of the stage play Doctor Who and the Daleks in the Seven Keys to Doomsday to a requirement from Hinchcliffe for a story about a human/robot relationship. However, after delivery Dicks was out of the country when it was decided that the robot, core to the story, could not be realised under the budget constraints. In excising the character, script editor Robert Holmes had to undertake the substantial rewrites without informing Dicks, who could not be contacted. The robot character was replaced with Solon who required a different motivation—that of a mad scientist. Dicks later said of the decision that it was not original but it was the "only one available". Upon his return to the United Kingdom, Dicks learnt of the changes and angrily phoned Holmes. Since the work was more Holmes than his own, Dicks demanded the removal of his name from the credits saying it could go out under a "bland pseudonym". This ended up being the name Robin Bland. 
The episodes were recorded entirely in studios during October 1975.

Cast notes
Philip Madoc had already appeared in The Krotons (1968–69) and The War Games (1969) and would appear afterwards in The Power of Kroll (1978–79). He also had a role in the film Daleks' Invasion Earth 2150 A.D. (1966) and appeared in the audio plays Master and Return of the Krotons.
Colin Fay was a fortunate find for the production team: an opera singer by trade, he was a large man and, as a newcomer to television, cheap to hire. Other cost cutting included hiring only a single professional dancer who was copied in the scenes by actresses who had been chosen because of previous dancing experience.

Faces in the mind-bending sequence
During the Doctor's mental battle with Morbius, the mind-bending machine displays two images of Morbius, then images of the Doctor's four incarnations as of the serial's production. These are followed by images of eight previously-unseen faces, intended to represent incarnations preceding the First Doctor. The Doctor's previous faces are almost all portrayed by members of the Doctor Who crew who worked on this serial or the following serial, The Seeds of Doom: production unit manager George Gallaccio, script editor Robert Holmes, production assistant Graeme Harper, director Douglas Camfield, producer Philip Hinchcliffe, production assistant Christopher Baker (who is the exception as he has no credits on Doctor Who), writer Robert Banks Stewart, and director Christopher Barry. Hinchcliffe stated, "We tried to get famous actors for the faces of the Doctor. But because no one would volunteer, we had to use backroom boys. And it is true to say that I attempted to imply that William Hartnell was not the first Doctor". After a complaint that actors were not used, the BBC paid a sum of money to the acting union Equity's benevolent fund. In 2020 it was announced that the three surviving members of the line-up (Philip Hinchcliffe, George Gallaccio and Graeme Harper) had returned to reprise their roles as the Doctor for a feature-length web film entitled The Timeless Doctors produced by multimedia artist Stuart Humphryes.

The season 14 story The Deadly Assassin introduced the idea that Time Lords are limited to 12 regenerations. The season 10 story The Three Doctors, produced and aired before both The Brain of Morbius and The Deadly Assassin, calls the William Hartnell Doctor the "earliest Doctor". Attempts to retrofit this with the number of faces seen in the mind test machine have brought about explanations including the possibility that the faces were Morbius' previous incarnations, younger versions of the First Doctor, or the Doctor's potential future incarnations. The Virgin Missing Adventure Cold Fusion by Lance Parkin implies that one of these prior Doctors was the incarnation of the Doctor active at the time of the birth of Susan Foreman. However, the subsequent Virgin New Adventures novel Lungbarrow states that Hartnell's Doctor was the first, implying instead that the faces represent incarnations of the Other, one of the founders of Time Lord civilisation, of whom the Doctor is the reincarnation.

The series 12 episode "The Timeless Children" (2020) confirmed that the faces were indeed incarnations pre-dating the William Hartnell Doctor; the same story also confirmed that the Doctor is not subject to the same regeneration limit as the rest of the Time Lords. However, in "The Name of the Doctor", Clara, a companion of the Doctor, enters the Doctor's timestream and does not see any pre-Hartnell incarnations of the Doctor.

Broadcast and reception

Upon the story's original broadcast, Mary Whitehouse (of the National Viewers' and Listeners' Association) complained of the violence displayed; she was quoted saying that The Brain of Morbius "contained some of the sickest and most horrific material seen on children's television". At the time the programme was under close scrutiny by the NVALA; complaints centred on the shooting of Condo by Solon with a resulting spurt of blood.

The story was repeated on BBC1 at 5:50 pm on 4 December 1976, edited and condensed into a one-hour-long omnibus episode. This edit—done without the director's participation—was similar (but not exactly the same) to the one used for the 1984 video release. The omnibus repeat was seen by 10.9 million viewers, a higher audience than the original episodic broadcast.

In 1984, Colin Greenland reviewed The Brain of Morbius for Imagine magazine, and stated that it was "lovely Gothic nonsense, enlivened by spirited characterisation." Paul Cornell, Martin Day, and Keith Topping wrote of the serial in The Discontinuity Guide (1995), "A superb exploration of gothic themes. Philip Madoc's portrayal of Solon is crucial to the story's success, and the pseudonymous epithet 'bland' is not at all deserved." In The Television Companion (1998), David J Howe and Stephen James Walker praised Madoc as Solon and the sets, and noted that the violence was realistic but adult. Together with Mark Stammers in the Fourth Doctor Handbook they described it as "everything a good piece of drama should be: entertaining, enjoyable, effective and emotional". In 2010, Patrick Mulkern of Radio Times awarded it five stars out of five. He noted that Solon's insistence that he only use the Doctor's head was "a fundamental lapse in logic", but otherwise said that the serial was "a salivating treat". The A.V. Club reviewer Christopher Bahn found some minor problems in the script, but gave a positive review of the story, pointing out how it did not rip off classic stories but repurposed them. DVD Talk's David Cornelius gave the serial four out of five stars, saying that it "allows for a wide range of storytelling tones without feeling cluttered or uneven", though at points the "silliness" of the Morbius costume threatened to "overtake" the story.

Commercial releases

In print

A novelisation of this serial, written by Terrance Dicks, was published by Target Books in June 1977. An unabridged reading of the novelisation by actor Tom Baker was released on CD in February 2008 by BBC Audiobooks.

Dicks also wrote a second adaptation for younger readers that was published in 1980 as Junior Doctor Who and the Brain of Morbius. A French translation of the full novelisation was published in 1987.

Home media
The serial was released on VHS in a 58-minute heavily edited omnibus format in July 1984 and complete in episodic form in July 1990. The edited version was also released on Betamax, Video 2000, and Laserdisc. The story was released in complete form on DVD on 21 July 2008.

References

External links

Target novelisation

Fourth Doctor serials
Doctor Who serials novelised by Terrance Dicks
1976 British television episodes
Television episodes about organ transplantation